Nenad Petrović, (September 7, 1907, in Zagreb, Kingdom of Croatia-Slavonia-Dalmatia, Austria-Hungary (now Croatia) – November 9, 1989, in Zagreb, Socialist Republic of Croatia, Yugoslavia) was a Croatian chess problemist.

Chess career
Nenad Petrović was the first Croatian Grandmaster of chess composition and World Champion in 1947 in the solving of chess problems. In 1951, he started the chess problem magazine Problem which in 1952 became the official organ of the Permanent Commission for Chess Composition of FIDE (PCCC).

Petrović was the creator of the "Codex of chess composition", the starter and editor of 13 volumes of FIDE Albums, containing the best compositions from the period 1914–82. From 1956, he was the vice-president, and from 1958 the president of PCCC. He organized the first World Congress of Chess Composition in Piran, 1958. In 1974, Petrović was made an honorary lifelong president of PCCC.

As a composer, he published some 650 problems, of which 121 were included in FIDE Albums. Many of them were records and tasks in chess composition.

Example

References

External links 
 Problems by Nenad Petrović on PDB Server 
 Nenad Petrović on www.problemonline.com

1907 births
1989 deaths
Chess composers
Croatian chess players
Grandmasters for chess composition
20th-century chess players